Vittoria Guazzini (born 26 December 2000) is an Italian professional racing cyclist, who currently rides for UCI Women's WorldTeam . She is also a member of Gruppo Sportivo Fiamme Oro, the sport section of Polizia di Stato, one of the national police forces.

Major results

Road

2018
 UEC European Junior Championships
1st  Time trial
2nd  Road race
 National Junior Championships
1st  Time trial
1st  Road race
 3rd Piccolo Trofeo Alfredo Binda
2019 
 3rd  Team relay, UEC European Championships
2020 
 3rd  Team relay, UEC European Championships
 3rd Time trial, National Championships
2021
 1st  Time trial, UEC European Under–23 Championships
 4th Dwars door Vlaanderen
2022
 UCI Road World Championships
1st  Under-23 time trial
2nd  Team relay
 1st  Time trial, Mediterranean Games
 3rd Le Samyn

Track

2017 
 1st  Team pursuit, UCI Junior World Championships
 1st  Team pursuit, UEC European Junior Championships
2018 
 UCI Junior World Championships
1st  Omnium
1st  Individual pursuit
1st  Team pursuit
 UEC European Junior Championships
1st  Omnium
1st  Individual pursuit
1st  Madison (with Gloria Scarsi)
 3rd Team pursuit, UCI Track World Cup, London
2019 
 UEC European Under-23 Championships
1st  Team pursuit
2nd  Individual pursuit
 3rd  Team pursuit, UEC European Championships
 UCI Track World Cup
3rd Team pursuit, Minsk
3rd Team pursuit, Glasgow
3rd Madison (with Chiara Consonni), Hong Kong
2020 
 UEC European Under-23 Championships
1st  Team pursuit
2nd  Individual pursuit
2022
 1st  Team pursuit, UCI World Championships

References

External links
 

2000 births
Living people
Italian female cyclists
Cyclists of Fiamme Oro
Place of birth missing (living people)
Olympic cyclists of Italy
Cyclists at the 2020 Summer Olympics
People from Pontedera
Cyclists from Tuscany
Sportspeople from the Province of Pisa
21st-century Italian women
Mediterranean Games gold medalists for Italy
Competitors at the 2022 Mediterranean Games
UCI Track Cycling World Champions (women)